Asin9ne (stylized in all caps) is the twenty-third studio album by American rapper Tech N9ne. It was released on October 8, 2021 via Strange Music. Production was handled by Wyshmaster, Freek Van Workum, ItsNicklus, Paul Salva, Ervin Pope, The Pushers, Brodinski, KROPSi, Seven and Tyler Pursel, with Travis O'Guin serving as executive producer. It features guest appearances from King Iso, Ashten Ray, Dwayne Johnson, E-40, Garrett Raff, Joey Cool, Kiddo A.I., Lil Wayne, Marcus "Oobergeek" Yates, Marley Young, Mumu Fresh, Navé Monjo, Nnutthowze-Zkeircrow, Phlaque The Grimstress, Russ, Seuss Mace, Shao Dow, Simeon Taylor, Snow Tha Product, Stige, and X-Raided. The album peaked at number 82 on the Billboard 200, number 41 on the Top R&B/Hip-Hop Albums, and number 11 on the Independent Albums in the US.

Track listing

Charts

References

2021 albums
Tech N9ne albums
Strange Music albums
Albums produced by Seven (record producer)